A gubernatorial election was held on 27 August 2006 to elect the next governor of , a prefecture of Japan located in the north of the Shikoku island.

Takeki Manabe of the Liberal Democratic Party (LDP) won the elections and was elected governor.

Candidates 

Takeki Manabe, 66, incumbent since 1998, former public servant. He was supported by the LDP and New Komeito.
Joji Tatara, 56, magazine editor, head of a nonprofit organization, was backed by the JCP.

Results

References 

2006 elections in Japan
Kagawa gubernational elections
Politics of Kagawa Prefecture